Godo may refer to several places:

Several places in Boulkiemdé Province, Burkina Faso:
 Godo, Nanoro 
 Godo, Pella
 Gōdo, Gifu, a town in Japan

Other uses 
 Sabri Godo (1929–2011), Albanian politician, writer and scriptwriter